KTKA-TV (channel 49) is a television station in Topeka, Kansas, United States, affiliated with ABC and The CW Plus. It is owned by Vaughan Media, LLC, which maintains joint sales and shared services agreements (JSA/SSA) with Nexstar Media Group, owner of NBC affiliate KSNT (channel 27) and low-power, Class A Fox affiliate KTMJ-CD (channel 43), for the provision of certain services. The stations share studios on Northwest 25th Street (US 24), near the unincorporated community of Kiro (with a Topeka mailing address), while KTKA-TV's transmitter is located along Southwest West Union Road west of Topeka.

History

Early history
The station first signed on the air on June 20, 1983, as KLDH (for original owner Larry D. Hudson), becoming the third commercial television station in the Topeka market. Channel 49 has been an ABC affiliate since its sign-on; prior to its debut, ABC programming had been relegated in the market to off-hours clearances on CBS affiliate WIBW-TV (channel 13) and NBC affiliate KTSB (channel 27, now KSNT); WIBW had been a secondary ABC affiliate since it signed on in November 1953, with ABC network programs that the station was unable to clear airing on KTSB beginning with its sign-on in December 1967.

The inception of channel 49 made Topeka one of the last television markets in the United States to have full-time affiliations from all three networks. Most of the area, however, could receive the entire ABC schedule from KMBC-TV in Kansas City or KQTV in St. Joseph. Both KMBC-TV and KQTV decently covered Topeka over the air, and KMBC-TV continued to be available on cable in Topeka for decades until Cox Communications removed the station from its lineup on March 6, 2013 due to frequent programming blackouts from enforcement of syndication exclusivity and network non-duplication rules. Channel 49 originally operated from studio facilities located in downtown Topeka at 101 SE Monroe.

However, KLDH was plagued by technical problems during its first two years on-air, including a transmitter fire that knocked it off the air for a few weeks, as well as a total collapse of its transmitter tower due to heavy ice build-up shortly thereafter. To relay its signal to the entire market, KLDH operated translator station K58CX in Lawrence; this repeater ceased operations in 1999. In May 1986, the station was purchased out of bankruptcy by Northeast Kansas Broadcast Services (owned by Berl Brechner), who changed the call letters to the current KTKA-TV on December 7, 1987. That year, the station also signed on a second translator, K39BR in Junction City; that repeater operated until 2009.

In 1998, KTKA relocated its operations to new studio facilities located on 21st Street and Chelsea Drive in the southwestern side of the city; the following year, the station began sharing the facility with radio station KTPK (106.9 FM), which Brechner purchased through his Kansas Capital Broadcasting subsidiary in 1997.

On August 29, 2005, Northeast Kansas Broadcast Services, which had previously sold KTPK to JMJ Broadcasting Co. for $5.7 million earlier that year, sold KTKA-TV to Lawrence-based Free State Communications—an indirect subsidiary of the World Company, publisher of the Lawrence Journal-World and then-owner of Lawrence cable television provider Sunflower Broadband—for $6.2 million. Among those who considered buying KTKA included Bill Kurtis (who began his career in television journalism as a reporter for competitor WIBW-TV in the 1960s), who at the time of Northeast Kansas Broadcast Services' sale of the station, was considering purchasing a broadcast television outlet in Topeka; Kurtis, upon further consideration, decided against purchasing channel 49. On July 26, 2008, Free State Communications announced that it was putting KTKA up for sale; the company reversed course in October of that year, pulling KTKA from the sale block, unable to find any buyers.

LMA with KSNT and KTMJ-CA
On February 4, 2011, Free State Communications announced that it would sell KTKA to Los Angeles-based PBC Broadcasting for $1.5 million. As part of the deal, New Vision Television – then-owner of KSNT, and which already maintained shared services and local marketing agreements with PBC-owned stations in Youngstown, Ohio and Savannah, Georgia, would operate KTKA-TV under a local marketing agreement. Despite objections to the sale by the American Cable Association, who alleged the sale could give the virtual triopoly involving KSNT, KTKA and KTMJ-CA too much leverage in negotiations for retransmission consent agreements, the Federal Communications Commission (FCC) approved the sale on July 21, 2011. PBC officially consummated on the purchase one week later on July 28. As a result, on July 30, 2011, KTKA merged its operations with KSNT and KTMJ-CA at the two station's facilities on Northwest 25th Street.

On May 7, 2012, LIN TV Corporation announced that it would acquire the New Vision Television station group, including KSNT and KTMJ-CD, for $330.4 million and the assumption of $12 million in debt. Along with the outright ownership of KSNT and KTMJ, the agreement included the acquisition of New Vision's shared services agreement with PBC Broadcasting, giving LIN operational control of KTKA-TV. LIN and Vaughan Media (which concurrently purchased the PBC stations) also entered into a joint sales agreement to provide advertising services for KTKA. The sale of New Vision to LIN Media and KTKA's purchase by Vaughan Media was approved by the FCC on October 2, with the transaction closing on October 12, 2012.

On March 21, 2014, Media General announced that it would purchase the LIN Media stations, including KSNT, KTMJ-CD, and the SSA/JSA with KTKA-TV, in a $1.6 billion merger. The FCC approved the merger on December 12, 2014, with the deal being consummated on December 19; however as a condition of the sale's approval, Media General was originally required to terminate the joint sales agreement between KTKA-TV and KSNT within two years, due to the FCC's ban on agreements involving the sale of advertising encompassing more than 15% of a separately-owned station's airtime.

KTKA-DT3
KTKA-DT3 is the CW+-affiliated second digital subchannel of KTKA-TV, broadcasting in high definition on channel 49.3. All programming on KTKA-DT3 is received through The CW's programming feed for smaller media markets, The CW Plus, which provides a set schedule of syndicated programming acquired by The CW during time periods without network programs; however, Vaughan Media handles local advertising and promotional services for the subchannel. Its on-air branding, Northeast Kansas CW 5, is derived from the station's primary cable channel placement on Cox Communications channel 5.

History
KTKA-DT3's history traces back to the September 21, 1998 launch of a cable-only affiliate of The WB that was originally managed and promoted by Cox Communications, alongside the launch of The WB 100+ Station Group, a national service that was created to expand coverage of The WB via primarily local origination channels managed by cable providers to smaller areas with a Nielsen Media Research market ranking above #100. The channel–which was branded on-air as "WB5", in reference to its primary cable position on Cox Communications in its Topeka service area–used the callsign "WBKS" (for "WB Kansas"), an unofficial callsign assigned by Cox as it was a cable-exclusive outlet not licensed by the Federal Communications Commission. Before the launch of "WBKS", viewers in the Topeka market received WB network programming from the network's January 1995 launch via the superstation feed of Chicago affiliate WGN-TV; residents in the far eastern portions of the market began receiving the network over-the-air through Kansas City affiliate KCWB (now CW affiliate KCWE) from its sign-on in September 1996, then from KSMO-TV when that station took over the market's WB affiliation in January 1998.

On January 24, 2006, Time Warner and CBS Corporation announced that the two companies would respectively shut down The WB and UPN to create The CW, which would feature programs from its two predecessors as well as new series that were produced specifically for the jointly-owned network. A national feed of the network, The CW Plus, was created by The CW as a replacement for The WB 100+ Station Group to allow the existing cable outlets as well as low-power analog stations and digital subchannels of major network affiliates in smaller markets that had joined The WB 100+ in the years following its launch to maintain a network affiliation. On April 10, 2006, Montecito Broadcast Group signed an affiliation agreement with The CW, allowing KSNT to serve as the network's Topeka affiliate (through The CW Plus) via its second digital subchannel. Montecito took over the operations of "WBKS" (now rebranded as "Northeast Kansas CW 5") on September 18, 2006, when The CW officially launched, providing the channel with full market coverage over-the-air.

On November 1, 2008, KSNT displaced CW programming from its 27.2 subchannel in favor of a standard-definition simulcast of Fox affiliate KTMJ-CA (which KSNT's then-owner New Vision Television acquired from Montgomery Communications earlier that year) to relay the station's programming to areas in the far northern and eastern fringes of the Topeka market that could not receive KTMJ's low-power signal; then-KTKA owners The World Company subsequently took over the operations of "Northeast Kansas CW 5", moving it to the station's third digital subchannel. By the end of 2016, KTKA-DT3 upgraded its signal resolution to 720p high definition.

Programming
KTKA-TV carries the entire ABC programming schedule; however, it airs an alternate live feed of ABC World News Tonight at 6 p.m. (opting to air a rebroadcast of KSNT's 5:00 p.m. newscast in the network newscast's recommended 5:30 p.m. timeslot), and broadcasts the network-syndicated Weekend Adventure block one hour earlier than most ABC affiliates due to the absence of a morning newscast on Saturdays. Syndicated programs broadcast on KTKA include Jeopardy!, Rachael Ray, The Doctors, Tamron Hall, Family Feud and Judge Judy. Topeka is one of the few markets where Jeopardy! and Wheel of Fortune air on separate stations; Wheel airs on CBS affiliate WIBW-TV.

KTKA also airs select games from the Kansas State Wildcats football team to be broadcast on ESPN College Football on ABC.

Newscasts and local programming
KTKA-TV presently broadcasts 16 hours of locally produced newscasts each week (with three hours each weekday and a half-hour each on Saturdays and Sundays); newscasts originate from sister station KSNT with all but one of them being simulcasts; KTKA airs a live newscast unique to its channel at 5:30 p.m. on weekedays. Unlike most ABC affiliates, the station does not carry newscasts on weekday middays or in the early evenings on Saturdays and Sundays.

Channel 49 established a news department when it signed on in 1983, with the debut of Newsline 49, a half-hour newscast that aired at 6:00 p.m. each weeknight and at 10:00 p.m. seven nights a week. By the mid-1990s, newscasts were added on weekday mornings and at 5:00 p.m. In September 1999, KTKA debuted The Locker Room Show, a sports highlight and discussion program that initially aired Friday nights after the late-evening newscast, focusing on high school and college athletics. This was followed by October 2001 the debut of Contacto Latino, a monthly magazine program focusing on issues pertinent to northeast Kansas' Hispanic and Latino community.

Throughout the 18-year run of KTKA's original news department (which was renamed 49 Eyewitness News in 1989, then to News Source 49 in 1995), the station's newscasts never gained much traction against WIBW-TV and KSNT, continually remaining in third place behind its established competitors. As a result of the continued viewership struggles and a decline in compensation revenue from ABC, KTKA shut down its news department on April 19, 2002, causing the layoffs of nine full-time and 17 part-time staffers; as a result of the shutdown of the original news department, KTKA-TV became one of the few Big Three affiliates that did not air any local newscasts—a group that includes fellow ABC affiliate KDNL-TV in St. Louis, CBS owned-and-operated station WWJ-TV in Detroit, and NBC affiliate WTWC-TV in Tallahassee, Florida.

The station replaced its weekday morning and 10:00 p.m. newscasts with syndicated programming, with its early-evening newscasts on weeknights being replaced by Talk of the Town, a local infotainment program—hosted by former WIBW-AM-FM radio host Betty Lou Pardue – featuring a mix of interviews, community event, sports, weather and entertainment segments. In addition, the station continued to produce short weather updates each weeknight at 5:00, 6:00 and 10:00 p.m. Due to low ratings (registering its lowest viewership by the May 2003 sweeps period with a 0 share), Talk of the Town was cancelled on July 11, 2003, resulting in the layoffs of six full-time and two part-time employees and the reassignment of two other production employees to channel 49's promotion and marketing department (the program was replaced by Extra and reruns of That 70's Show, respectively, at 5:00 and 6:00 p.m.); The Locker Room Show was also placed on hiatus before it was eventually cancelled that fall. Locally produced weather updates were dropped on July 31, 2003, when the contract of meteorologist Dave Relihan (one of the few holdovers from the former news department, who joined KTKA in July 2000 after a Shawnee County District Court judge settled a non-compete clause dispute between Relihan and his former longtime employer WIBW-TV) was not renewed. In September 2003, the station began airing local weather cut-ins on weekday evenings, which were produced by WeatherVision out of its headquarters in Jackson, Mississippi.

After being acquired by Free State Communications, the company decided to start a new news department for KTKA-TV, hiring 29 staffers and acquiring new software and hardware for the re-development of its news operations. On February 5, 2006, following ABC's telecast of Super Bowl XL and a post-game episode of Grey's Anatomy, the station restored news operations (under the brand 49 News) with the debut of a half-hour nightly late-evening newscast at 10:00 p.m.; the following day on February 6, KTKA debuted a 90-minute morning newscast (starting at 5:30 a.m. weekdays) titled Good Morning Kansas and a half-hour early-evening newscast at 6:00 p.m. on Monday through Saturday evenings. Under the ownership of The World Company, KTKA also shared news content resources with Lawrence-based sister cable news channel 6 News Lawrence. In September 2007, the station debuted a midday newscast at 11:00 a.m. weekdays. Free State heavily invested in the new news department, particularly in weather coverage, creating a large network of SkyCams throughout the Topeka market (including sites located in Lawrence, Emporia, Junction City and on the Kansas State University campus in Manhattan—the latter of which captured an EF4 tornado that hit the city on the evening of June 11, 2008), and the acquisition of a customized and modified Hummer H2 (known as the "49 StormTracker") for storm chasing.

However, the viewership struggles that arose with the original news department continued with the new operation; as a result, the station cancelled its weekday morning and midday newscasts on November 6, 2008, as part of budget cuts that resulted in the layoffs of nine employees.

As a result of the sale to PBC Broadcasting and local marketing agreement with New Vision Television, KSNT took over production of KTKA's newscasts, using existing staff from both stations. Weekday evening anchor Ben Bauman and chief meteorologist Matt Miller were among the KTKA staffers that joined the new joint operation. The station aired its final in-house newscast on July 29, 2011, with that evening's 10:00 p.m. newscast; KSNT started producing channel 49's newscasts the following day on July 30—beginning with the 6:00 p.m. newscast – under the uniform branding Kansas First News, with the two stations initially simulcasting newscasts on weekday mornings and at 6:00 and 10:00 p.m.; the early-evening newscast moved to 6:30 in September 2012 as an exclusive newscast, before moving to 5:30 p.m. in September 2012, now airing in the form of a rebroadcast of KSNT's 5:00 p.m. broadcast. At some point later on, KSNT replaced the rebroadcast with a live production. On May 4, 2013, KSNT and KTKA respectively became the second and third (and last) television stations in the Topeka market to begin broadcasting its local newscasts in high definition.

Beginning with the 5:00 p.m. newscast on January 26, 2015, KSNT quietly dropped the Kansas First News brand, with the introduction of a new graphics package and news set, as well as a uniform logo scheme for all three stations (consisting of only the station's respective call letters and the logo of their affiliated network), with newscasts on KSNT, KTMJ and KTKA being rebranded as KSNT News.

In March 2022, KSNT introduced a new logo and revived the 27 News brand across newscasts seen on both KSNT and KTKA. Newscasts continued to use the previous graphics and music from the KSNT News brand at the time.

Notable former on-air staff
Tim Joyce – meteorologist (now at KCPQ in Seattle, and KRCW-TV in Portland, Oregon)

In popular culture
A shotgun-wielding Annie Wilkes chases a KTKA TV news reporter and cameraman away from her home in Stephen King's 1987 novel Misery. At the time King wrote the book, KTKA, which he placed in Grand Junction, Colorado, did not exist.

Technical information

Subchannels
The station's digital signal is multiplexed:

Analog-to-digital conversion
KTKA-TV shut down its analog signal, over UHF channel 49, at 12:01 a.m. on February 17, 2009, the original target date in which full-power television stations in the United States were to transition from analog to digital broadcasts under federal mandate (which was later pushed back to June 12, 2009). The station's digital signal remained on its pre-transition UHF channel 48. Through the use of PSIP, digital television receivers display the station's virtual channel as its former UHF analog channel 49. In mid-2010, the station relocated its digital signal to its former analog allocation on UHF channel 49.

See also
Channel 5 branded TV stations in the United States
Channel 16 digital TV stations in the United States
Channel 49 virtual TV stations in the United States

References

External links
 
 KTKA-DT3 website – The CW 5

ABC network affiliates
Dabl affiliates
The CW affiliates
Antenna TV affiliates
Television channels and stations established in 1983
Television stations in Topeka, Kansas
Nexstar Media Group
1983 establishments in Kansas